Mongrando is a comune (municipality) in the Province of Biella in the Italian region Piedmont, located about  northeast of Turin and about  southwest of Biella.

Mongrando borders the following municipalities: Borriana, Camburzano, Donato, Graglia, Netro, Occhieppo Inferiore, Ponderano, Sala Biellese, Zubiena. The communal territory is crossed by the Elvo torrent.

Italian-Brazilian filmmaker Vittorio Capellaro   was born in Mongrando in 1877.

References